The Roman Catholic Diocese of Sikasso is a diocese located in the city of Sikasso in the ecclesiastical province of Bamako in Mali.

History
 June 12, 1947: Established as Apostolic Prefecture of Sikasso from the Apostolic Vicariate of Bobo-Dioulasso in Burkina Faso
 July 6, 1963: Promoted as Diocese of Sikasso

Leadership
 Prefects Apostolic of Sikasso
 Father Didier Pérouse de Montclos, M. Afr. (17 October 1947 – 6 July 1963)
 Bishops of Sikasso
 Didier Pérouse de Montclos, M. Afr. (6 July 1963 – 8 July 1976)
 Jean-Baptiste Maria Cissé (8 July 1976 – 3 November 1996)
 Jean-Baptiste Tiama (5 November 1998 - 27 March 2020), appointed Bishop of Mopti
 Robert Cissé (14 December 2022 – present)

See also
Roman Catholicism in Mali

References

External links
 GCatholic.org

Sikasso
Sikasso
Christian organizations established in 1947
Roman Catholic dioceses and prelatures established in the 20th century
1947 establishments in French Sudan
Roman Catholic Ecclesiastical Province of Bamako